Hryb is a surname. Notable people with the surname include:

 J.C. Hryb (born 1968), French-born American interior designer
 Larry Hryb, Microsoft employee
 Myechyslaw Hryb (born 1938), Belarusian politician and President of Belarus
 Tamaš Hryb (1895–1938), Belarusian politician, journalist, and writer
 Taras Hryb (1952–2021), Canadian wrestler